Garth Burton (21 June 1913 – 6 September 1993) was an Australian cricketer. He played three first-class matches for South Australia between 1939 and 1940.

See also
 List of South Australian representative cricketers

References

External links
 

1913 births
1993 deaths
Australian cricketers
South Australia cricketers
Cricketers from Adelaide